Weichán Auka Mapu (WAM) is a Mapuche armed and revolutionary organization that operates mainly in southern Chile, being a supporter of armed struggle through arson attacks, sabotage actions and clashes with firearms against police officers, in order to achieve full autonomy for the Mapuche people.

The WAM was founded in 2011, as a splinter group from the Coordinadora Arauco Malleco. It committed its first action on December 17, 2013, with an arson attack on a management house in Vilcún.

History

Origins
In 2010, a dissident faction formed inside the Coordinadora Arauco Malleco (CAM). They disagreed with the possibility of engaging in dialogue between Mapuche representatives and the Chilean Government, since they considered that negotiations would interfere with the project of Mapuche National Liberation. Following the course taken by the CAM, the dissatisfied former militants chose to found their own organization in order to continue their violent actions.

In their first statement released on April 20, 2016 where they explain the reason for their "armed resistance" and the meaning of their coat of arms. The cultrun represents "the totality of our Wallmapu and the 4 parts of the spiritual basis of existence as a People-Nation". The spear symbolizes their ancestral resistance and the shotgun symbolizes their present resistance, calling it "rudimentary but worthy." In addition to the way in which the spear and shotgun were placed, the statement "states that said weapons are not invasive, but are an integral part of our Mapuche Nation People."

Arson attacks
2017
On June 17, 2017, a truck with a hopper and several machines were destroyed in Puerto Saavedra, in a new arson attack in the area that affected the construction company CIAL Ltd. Carabineros said that five people participated in the event, and that they had attacked two guards.

On July 26 of the same year, Chilean authorities said that an evangelical church was set on fire in a southern region that the Mapuche indigenous group claim as their ancestral territory.

On August 19, an arson attack affected 18 trucks belonging to the Calafquén transportation company, located at kilometer 686 of Route 5 south of Temuco. A brochure was found on the site that attributed the incident to the Mapuche group.

On August 26, at least 29 trucks were burned in San José de la Mariquina. In place, they left a brochure where the Weichan Auka Mapu group took responsibility for the attack. On August 10, 2018, a group of Mapuche militants burned an evangelical church in the municipality of Budimallín. At the site of the attack, canvases related to the Mapuche cause were found. 

2018
On August 11, 2018, six WAM militants were indicted for their participation in an attack on a farm in Cuyinpahué, owned by Forestal Arauco.

2019
On September 12, 2019, members of the WAM set fire to two sheds in the Santa Adela farm, located in the Nueva Imperial district, leaving behind leaflets belonging to the group. Later the government confirmed a complaint for a terrorist arson after the attack was reported.

2020
A fire caused to the San Fidel major seminary was reported in Padre Las Casas, with no casualties reported in the attack. The attack occurred at approximately 3:30 a.m., partially destroying the facilities and leaving a canvas.

References

2011 establishments in Chile
Anarchist militant groups
Anarchist organisations in Chile
Anti-fascist organizations
Guerrilla movements in Latin America
Indigenous organisations in Chile
Indigenous rights organizations in South America
Mapuche conflict
Mapuche organizations
Terrorism in Chile